Ek Hi Bhool is a 1981 Indian Hindi-language drama film, produced by A. Purnachandra Rao under the Lakshmi Productions banner and directed by T. Rama Rao. The film stars Jeetendra and Rekha, with music composed by Laxmikant–Pyarelal. It is a remake of the Tamil film Mouna Geethangal (1981).

Plot
Ram Kumar Shrivastava & Sadhana work in a firm that loves and marries. They live happily, but in a short time, Sadhana makes Ram acquainted with her widowed friend Urvashi. Accidentally, they both spend a night and out of contrition confess his sin before Sadhana. Therefore, she divorces him, despite being pregnant. After 5 years, they encounter at the office and neighborhood but Sadhana is still reckoning on Ram. Here, Ram is delighted to see his son Raju and they befriend which Sadhana denies. Later, Raju grasps the truth and tries to unite his parents. Now, Sadhana altercates with Ram to discard when he too rebukes and gives her 30 days to return. Meanwhile, Teg Bahadur their co-employee ploys to denounce Sadhana publicly as revenge for previous humiliation. Everyone believes it except Ram which also proves her unsullied. Accordingly, Sadhana understands his virtue and repents. At last, Ram makes plays along with Raju by announcing his remarriage, which makes Sadhana reconcile with him. Finally, the movie ends on a happy note.

Cast
 Jeetendra as Ram Kumar Shrivastav
 Rekha as Sadhana Shrivastav
 Shabana Azmi as Meenakshi 
 Nazneen as Urvashi  
 Asrani as Manohar Prasad "M.P."
 Agha as Sadhana's Father 
 Yunus Parvez as Lallu Lal  
 Dinesh Hingoo
 Jagdish Raj as Ram's Boss      
 Mazhar Khan as Teg Bahadur
 Raja Duggal as Bus Conductor

Soundtrack

References

External links
 

1981 films
1980s Hindi-language films
Films directed by T. Rama Rao
Films scored by Laxmikant–Pyarelal
Hindi remakes of Tamil films